The Jack Gaughan Award for Best Emerging Artist is an American award honoring the memory of illustrator Jack Gaughan. Because the latter felt it was important to encourage and recognize new blood in the field, the New England Science Fiction Association, Inc., presents the Gaughan Award annually to an emerging artist (an artist who has become a professional within the past five years) chosen by a panel of judges.

The winner of the  Gaughan Award  is announced during Boskone, NESFA's annual convention.

 1986 Stephen Hickman
 1987 Val Lakey Lindahn
 1988 Bob Eggleton
 1989 Dell Harris
 1990 Keith Parkinson
 1991 Richard Hescox
 1992 Jody Lee
 1993 Nicholas Jainschigg
 1994 Dorian Vallejo
 1995 Bruce Jensen
 1996 Charles Lang
 1997 Lisa Snellings-Clark
 1998 Donato Giancola
 1999 Brom
 2000 Stephen Daniele
 2001 Mark Zug
 2002 Terese Nielsen
 2003 Martina Pilcerova
 2004 Justin Sweet
 2005 Adam Rex
 2006 Scott M. Fischer
 2007 Dan Dos Santos
 2008 Shelly Wan
 2009 Eric Fortune
 2010 Tyler Jacobson
 2014 Sam Burley
 2016 Tommy Arnold
 2017 Kirbi Fagan
 2018 Alessandra Maria Pisano
 2019 Nicolas Delort
 2020 Iris Compiet

See also 

 Science fiction fandom
 Science fiction artists
 List of science fiction awards

External links 
 NESFA
 Gaughan Award
 Boskone

Regional and local science fiction awards